Mošenik is a settlement on the left bank of the Sava River in the Municipality of Zagorje ob Savi in central Slovenia. The railway line from Ljubljana to Zidani Most runs through the settlement. The area is part of the traditional region of Upper Carniola. It is now included with the rest of the municipality in the Central Sava Statistical Region.

References

External links

Mošenik on Geopedia

Populated places in the Municipality of Zagorje ob Savi